Walton Park is a census-designated place (CDP) in Orange County, New York, United States. As of the 2020 census, the CDP had a total population of 3,907. Walton Park is on the town line separating the towns of Chester and Monroe. Street addresses within Walton Park are usually assigned to Monroe, not Chester.

Geography 
Walton Park is located at  (41.311849, -74.223838).

The total area is 11.57% water.

The community is on the west side of Walton Lake.

Demographics 

As of the census of 2000, there were 2,330 people, 776 households, and 637 families residing in the CDP. The population density was 983.0 per square mile (379.6/km2). There were 871 housing units at an average density of 367.5/sq mi (141.9/km2). The racial makeup of the CDP was 94.08% White American, 1.03% African American, 0.90% Native American, 1.29% Asian, 0.17% Pacific Islander, 1.55% from other races, and 0.99% from two or more races.  Hispanic or Latino people of any race were 7.04% of the population.

There were 776 households, out of which 45.1% had children under the age of 18 living with them, 72.6% were married couples living together, 6.8% had a female householder with no husband present, and 17.9% were non-families. 14.3% of all households were made up of individuals, and 4.6% had someone living alone who was 65 years of age or older. The average household size was 3.00 and the average family size was 3.35.

In the CDP, the population was spread out, with 30.1% under the age of 18, 5.3% from 18 to 24, 30.7% from 25 to 44, 25.6% from 45 to 64, and 8.3% who were 65 years of age or older. The median age was 37 years. For every 100 females, there were 100 males. For every 100 females age 18 and over, there were 94.6 males.

The median income for a household in the CDP was $70,938, and the median income for a family was $81,139. Males had a median income of $54,375 versus $34,917 for females. The per capita income for the CDP was $28,463.  About 2.5% of families and 2.4% of the population were below the poverty line, including 3.0% of those under the age of 18 and none of those 65 and older.

References

Census-designated places in Orange County, New York
Census-designated places in New York (state)